Greatest Hits (titled on the back cover as Greatest Hits 87–92) is a 2002 greatest hits album by Australian singer Kylie Minogue. Released on 18 November 2002 by PWL, the album collects work from Minogue's PWL period, including the albums Kylie (1988), Enjoy Yourself (1989), Rhythm of Love (1990), Let's Get to It (1991) and Greatest Hits (1992).

An updated version of the compilation called Greatest Hits 87–97 was later released on 24 November 2003 by BMG and PWL, distributed by Jive, due to her release of Body Language in early 2004. The cover sleeve for the version was shot by British photographer Simon Fowler in 1990. This version of the album includes songs and remixes from Kylie Minogue (1994) and Impossible Princess (1997), and also received positive reception from music critics.

Background
After the massive success of Minogue's eighth studio album Fever, BMG decided to release a greatest hits album.

The 2002 album cover used a stock photo photographed by Jasper James, which depicts a supposed look-alike dressed in her underwear. AllMusic's Johnny Loftus called it "shoddy." The updated version of the compilation later used a picture from Minogue's photoshoot with Simon Fowler in 1990.

The release ruffled some feathers in the Kylie camp, in particular the cover artwork. An 'official' cover, designed by Kylie and her team was made available to download from her website and was also given away free inside copies of Heat magazine. Titled Vintage Kylie, the card insert bore the cheeky message "Like Kylie? Why not have the real thing!" A version of the compilation titled Best of was also released in France, but withdrawn from sale on day of release.

Due to Minogue's release of her then-new album, Body Language, in February 2004, BMG re-released the compilation.

Critical response
Greatest Hits

Johnny Loftus from AllMusic gave the compilation two stars out of five, he felt that there's nothing in the album feels "very exclusive," with the remixes "are readily available to aficionados in other, less after-market places." He also suggested readers to the 2003 version, calling it "a much better option for the casual listener." Writing for Amazon.co.uk, John Galilee compared her music to "fine wine", which "has aged gracefully over the years", questioned the replacement of "It's No Secret" with the B-side track "Say the Word - I'll Be There" but concluded: "The collection adds weight to Kylie's early mentor Pete Waterman's assertion that Stock, Aitken and Waterman would one day be viewed as the 1980s equivalent of Motown. Who would have thought back in 1988 that "I Should Be So Lucky" and "Je Ne Sais Pas Pourquoi" would become such gems?"

Greatest Hits 87–97

Chris True from AllMusic gave the compilation four stars out of five, praised it as a "valid and well-represented (yet oddly out of chronological order) anthology of what Americans were missing" between the 15-year she first received success in the United States with "Locomotion" and then with "Can't Get You Out of My Head." "For those who were surprised by her sudden reappearance, this will fill in the picture quite nicely, and for those who just couldn't get enough of Minogue upon hearing her for the first time in 2002, Greatest Hits 87-97 will surely satisfy," he stated.

Commercial performance
In the United Kingdom, Greatest Hits debuted at number 20. It has spent a total of 13 weeks overall on the chart.

Track listing
All songs written and produced by Mike Stock, Matt Aitken and Pete Waterman except where noted.

Greatest Hits

Greatest Hits 87–97
The Japan edition replaces “Made In Heaven” with “It’s No Secret” and adds an previously unreleased instrumental version of “Turn It Into Love” at the end of disc 2.

Charts

Weekly charts
Greatest Hits

Greatest Hits 87–97

Greatest Hits (DVD version)Greatest Hits 87–97 (DVD version)Year-end chartsGreatest Hits

Certifications
Greatest Hits

Greatest Hits (DVD version)

References

2002 greatest hits albums
Kylie Minogue compilation albums
Kylie Minogue remix albums
Kylie Minogue video albums
Music video compilation albums
2002 remix albums